Junkovac is a village located in the municipality of Lazarevac, Belgrade, Serbia. As of 2011 census, it has a population of 834 inhabitants.

History
In October 2019, he village of Sakulja (which was resettled in 1984) was officially abolished in October 2019 and its territory was annexed to the neighboring Junkovac.

References

Suburbs of Belgrade
Lazarevac